Dixcove is a coastal village and a fishing community in the Ahanta West district, a district in the Western Region of South Ghana, located approximately 35 km west of the regional capital of Sekondi-Takoradi. The current Paramount Chief of Upper Dixcove is Obrempong Hima Dekyi XIV.

History 
From the early 17th-19th century, Dixcove is in two quarters known as Ntwarkro (Upper Dixcove) and Daazikessie (Lower Dixcove). The town was centre for trade during the Gold Coast era.

Economy
Dixcove is the site of Fort Metal Cross, an English-built fort which was completed in 1698, which dominates the fishing village and town from a bluff located on the eastern side of the village. Upper and Lower Dixcove purchase premix fuel to the fishermen.

Institutions 

 Dixcove Government Hospital
 Dixcove Fort

References

Sources

External links
 G-pedia webpage - Dixcove

Populated places in Ahanta West Municipal District